Tafersit (Tarifit: Tfaasit, ⵜⴰⴼⴻⵔⵙⵉⵜ; Arabic: تفرسيت) is a commune in Driouch Province, Oriental, Morocco. The town is situated in the Rif mountains, not far from the Mediterranean Sea. According to the 2004 census, it has a population of 3,555.

Notable people
 Abdelouafi Laftit (born 1967), Minister of Interior of Morocco since 5 April 2017.
 Farid Azarkan (born 1971), Dutch politician who was born in Ighmiren, a department of Tafersit.

References

Populated places in Driouch Province